These are some of the notable events relating to politics in 2013.

Events

January
January 21
Barack Obama begins his second term as President of the United States.
Attempted coup d'état in Eritrea
Nyamko Sabuni resigns as  deputy education minister in Sweden, and is replaced with Maria Arnholm.

January 23 – In a speech in London, British Prime Minister David Cameron outlines his intention to renegotiate the terms of the UK's membership of the European Union then offer a referendum on United Kingdom withdrawal from the European Union if a new deal is agreed.

February
February 11 – Pope Benedict XVI announces his resignation as head of state of the Vatican City State, effective on the 28th.

July
July 1 – Croatia becomes the 28th member of the European Union.

November
November 1 – 2013 Thai protests began.

November 11 – The 19th yearly session of the United Nations Climate Change Conference began in Warsaw, Poland, lasting until 22 November 2013.

References

External links

 
Politics by year
21st century in politics
2010s in politics